= TeAtrum VII =

German theatre company

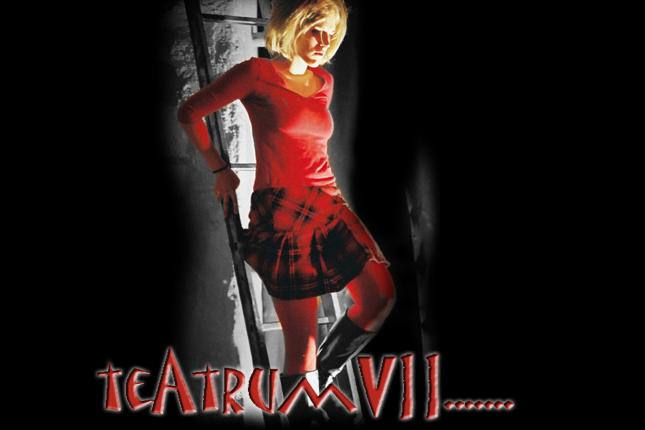
teAtrum VII: Logo (until 2010)

teAtrum 7 (or "teAtrum VII") is a German theatre company based in Frankfurt, Germany and Berlin. Until 2013, the most important venue in Frankfurt was located in an old landmarked factory building. Many productions of the theatre company take place on partly extraordinary locations: in cellar vaults, in schools and colleges, in the foyer of the Frankfurt Opera, in night clubs, former factory floors and storehouses.

The theatre company was founded in 1996 in Frankfurt and is now (since 2010) also based in Berlin. Experiments with language and speech, motion, dance, music, pictures, spaces, sounds and the usage of modern media (film, video, photography) are fundamental components of the productions.

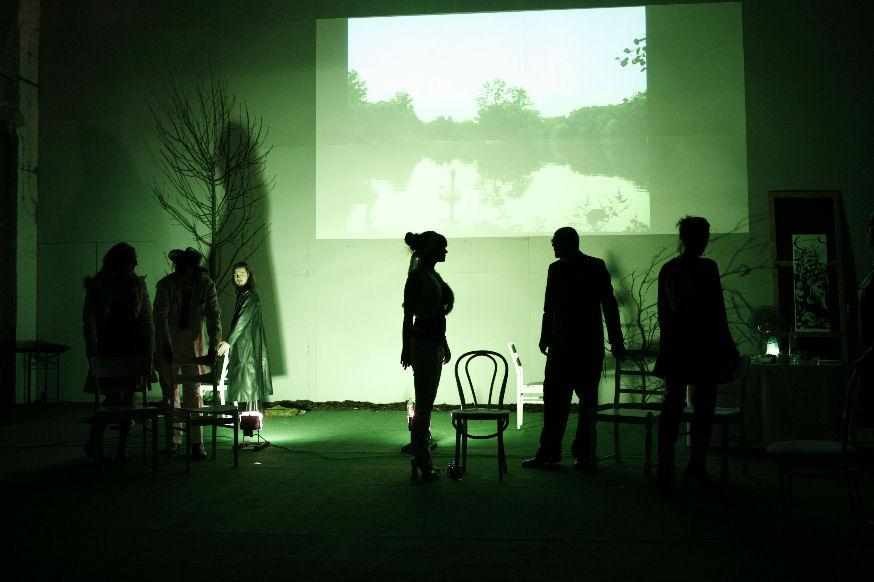
teAtrum VII production The Seagull, 2007 (de:"Naxoshalle")

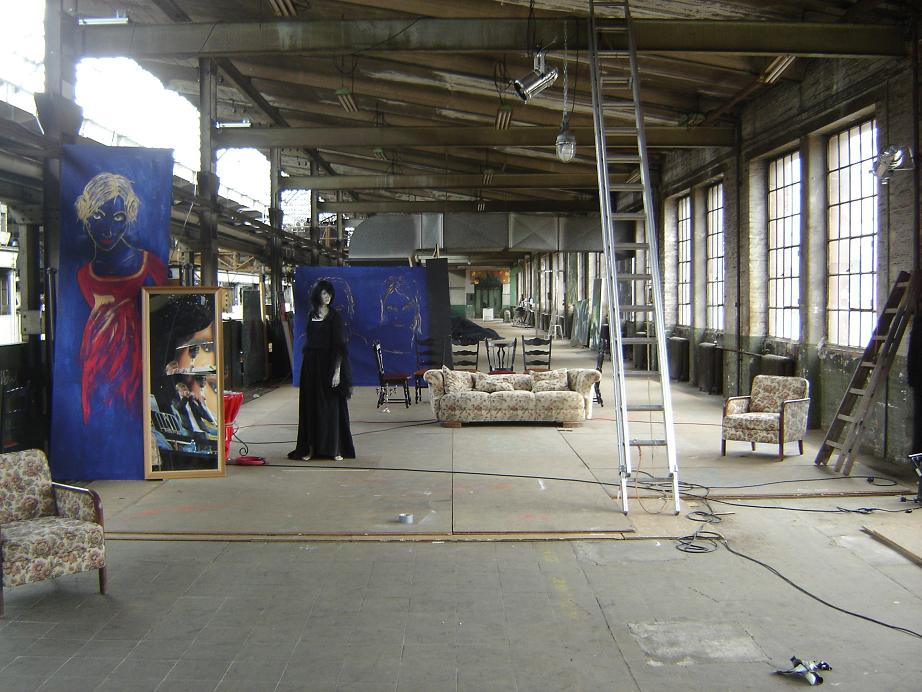
de:Naxoshalle in Frankfurt: Stage of the Canterville rehearsals, April 2008

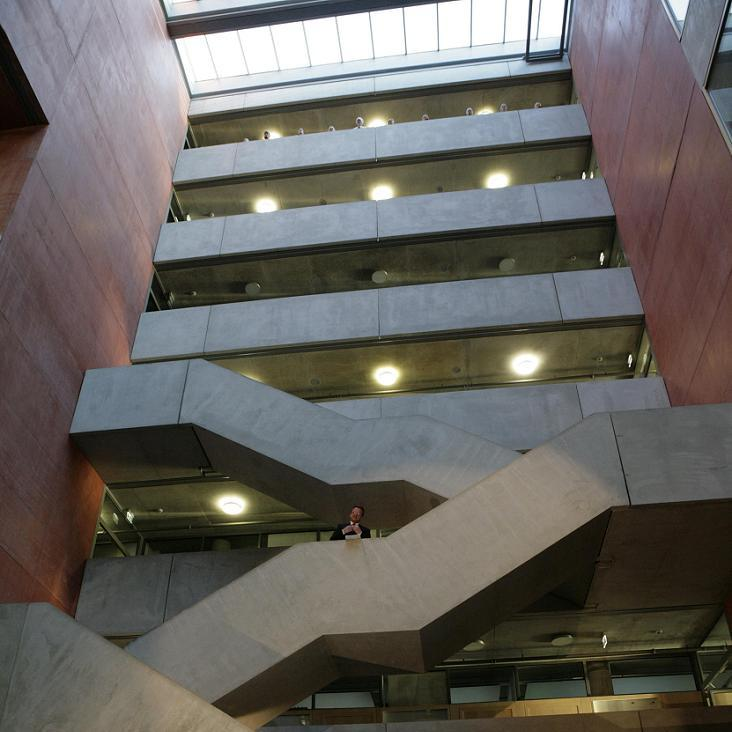
Theatre performance Gegenwind / Head Wind in the foyer of the Frankfurt University of Applied Sciences
